Sir William Samuel Glyn-Jones (1869 – 9 September 1927) was a British Liberal Party politician and pharmacist.

Background
He was born to Welsh parents in Worcester in 1869, the son of George Griffith Jones. He was educated at Merthyr Tydfil Grammar School. He married in 1894, Mary Evans of Tower Hill, Llanybydder, Carmarthen. They had two sons and two daughters. His eldest son, Hildreth Glyn-Jones, became an eminent barrister and High Court judge. His younger son, John, was an actor.

Career
He was Called to Bar, Middle Temple in 1904. He was appointed an Alderman to Middlesex County Council. Standing for the first time, he fought the January 1910 General Election as Liberal candidate for Stepney, coming second. He served as Liberal Member of Parliament for Stepney from December 1910–18. He gained the seat from the Conservatives at the December 1910 General Election. When his constituency was abolished in 1918 he decided to retire from parliament. 

He was knighted in 1919. He served as a Justice of the Peace for Middlesex. He was a Pharmacist. He was Secretary to the Royal Pharmaceutical Society of Great Britain from 1918–26. He had published The Law of Poisons and Pharmacy in 1909. He was Chairman of the Council of the Proprietary Articles Trade Association, and since 1926 of the Canadian Proprietary Articles Trade Association.

He died in Vancouver after a month-long illness.

References

External links 
 

1869 births
1927 deaths
Liberal Party (UK) MPs for English constituencies
UK MPs 1910–1918
Knights Bachelor
Members of the Middle Temple
English pharmacists
Politicians awarded knighthoods
Members of Middlesex County Council
English justices of the peace